Simona Brhlikova-Roman was born in former Czechoslovakia. From a young age, she appeared in several stage and musical productions.

Graduating from Commerce & Language Academy in Slovakia, Simona moved to London where she perfected her English at University College London, and trained at RADA and The Actors Centre. She also speaks seven languages. Simona left her family home at the age of 17 to travel North America and Africa before moving to London to pursue her acting career.

Simona first worked in theatre in London, in productions like Much Ado About Nothing, As You Like It, Queen of Spades. This then led to a string of independent films including a major role in Lycanthropy (2006), alongside George Calil and David Bradley, and then to television work on such shows as The IT Crowd, Life Begins, Footballers' Wives, Bad Girls and Casanova's Love Letters.

Moving onto international projects, Brhlikova landed the role of the villainess Kisscut in Gallowwalker starring opposite Wesley Snipes, and Maddoff: Made off with America about the infamous Ponzi schemer Bernie, playing mastermind "Ursula aka Mrs X".
In her latest film venture, Simona can be seen adding a touch of mystery and sophistication to Danny Dyer's VENDETTA https://www.imdb.com/title/tt2572632/combined out in the winter 2013 by Anchor Bay.

Simona now lives and works in London and Los Angeles.

References

External links
 
 Celebrity Travel: Simona Brhlikova
 Celebrity article

1981 births
Living people